The 1977 Jackson State Tigers football team represented the Jackson State University during the 1977 NCAA Division I football season as a member of the Southwestern Athletic Conference (SWAC). Led by second-year head coach W. C. Gorden, the Tigers compiled an overall record of 8–3 and a mark of 5–1 in conference play, placing second in the SWAC. It was their first season as a member of Division I.

Schedule

References 

Jackson State
Jackson State Tigers football seasons
Jackson State Tigers football